The 1974 Houston Cougars football team represented the University of Houston in the 1974 NCAA Division I football season.  The team was coached by 13th-year head coach Bill Yeoman, compiled an 8–3–1 record, and outscored their opponents by a total of 280 to 185.

Schedule

References

Houston
Houston Cougars football seasons
Houston Cougars football